Ljeskovac is a place located south of the city of Bijeljina in Republika Srpska, Bosnia and Herzegovina.

External links
 Official website (Serbian)  

Bijeljina
Populated places in Bijeljina